Anna Sheina (born 13 May 2000) is a Russian handball player who plays for Dinamo Volgograd  in the Russian Super League.

At the end of 2019, she got injured.

Achievements 
Youth World Championship:
Winner: 2018
 Student Championship of Russia
Winner: 2017
 Youth Championship of Russia
Winner: 2018-19
Source:

References

Weblinks 
 Profil of the Russian Handball Federation
 Profile from Dinamo

2000 births
Living people
Russian female handball players
Sportspeople from Volgograd